The Macchi M.C.99 was a prototype 1930s Italian twin-engined torpedo-bomber flying boat designed and built by Macchi.

Development
The M.C.99 was designed by Mario Castoldi as a military flying boat, resembling the earlier commercial M.C.94 and was a wooden twin-engined shoulder-wing cantilever monoplane. Constructed mainly of wood, it was a high-wing cantilever monoplane flying boat. With a crew of five, it had an enclosed cabin and had defensive gun positions in the bow, amidships and in the tail. The prototype and only M.C.99 was powered by two  Isotta Fraschini Asso XI R.2C.15 engines, strut-mounted above the wings. Briefly flown in 1937 it did not enter production.

Specifications

See also

References
Notes

Bibliography
 *

External links

Photo of a Macchi M.C.99

M.C.094=9
1930s Italian bomber aircraft
Flying boats
Shoulder-wing aircraft
Aircraft first flown in 1937
Twin piston-engined tractor aircraft